The Schneekirche is a church made annually from snow in Mitterfirmiansreut, in the district of Freyung-Grafenau in Bavaria, Germany.

History
In 1911, a group of villagers in Mitterfirmiansreut got the idea to build a snow church in protest that the church officials did not give them money to build one.  The 1910-1911 winter had left a lot of snow, so they went to work in February.  Men and women worked to cut out snow blocks for their church.  The finished ice church was 14m long, 7m wide and 4m high. The first worship was held on the 28th of March, 1911. The church gained attention internationally, and the group began to receive donations for construction of a stone church.

Present day
The villagers decided to build another snow church to commemorate the one hundredth anniversary of that church in 2011.  However, they ran into a lack of snow.  It finally snowed, though they did not make it to their hoped Christmas opening.  In the early stage, Catholic leaders expressed skepticism, and the local Bishop refused to consecrate it. Eventually the new ice church was built.  It cost €100,000, or US $200,000  to build, using 1,400 cubic meters (49,000 cubic feet) of snow and slabs of ice.  The dimensions are more than 20 meters long, 10 meters wide, and the church includes a 17-meter tower. It can seat 190 people. It's made up of about 1400 cubic meters of snow. Blue lighting elements are built into the ice, to enhance its appearance.

Even before the building was completed, there was a number of requests for baptisms and weddings.  The nearby  Catholic Bishop of Passau, Wilhelm Schraml, initially ruled out masses, baptisms or weddings from being held at the church for theological reasons, though, worship services were allowed to be held. Before it melted, it was nicknamed "God's Igloo" by a major newspaper.

Freyung-Grafenau